Brdce nad Dobrno is a dispersed settlement in the Municipality of Dobrna in Slovenia. The area is part of the traditional region of Styria. The municipality is now included in the Savinja Statistical Region.

Name
The name of the settlement was changed from Brdce to Brdce nad Dobrno in 1953.

Cultural heritage
A monument to 39 Partisans who were killed in the area in February 1944 was unveiled in 1952.

References

External links
Brdce nad Dobrno on Geopedia

Populated places in the Municipality of Dobrna